Gunda javanica is a moth of the family Bombycidae first described by Frederic Moore in 1872. It is found in the north-eastern parts of the Himalayas, Myanmar, Sundaland, Palawan and Sulawesi. The habitat consists of lowland rainforest.

External links
"Gunda javanica Moore". The Moths of Borneo. Retrieved November 6, 2018.

Bombycidae